Smout is a surname. Notable people with the surname include:
 Sir Arthur Smout (1888–1961), Director-General of Small Arms Production for the British Armed Forces during World War II 
 Christopher Smout (born 1933), Scottish academic, historian, and author
 Dominicus Smout (before 1671 – after 1733) Flemish painter 
 Edward Smout (1898–2004), Australian soldier
 Kees Smout (1876–1961), Dutch sculptor
 Lucas Smout the Elder (f 1631–1674), Flemish painter
 Lucas Smout the Younger (1671–1713), Flemish painter

Smoot, Smootz, Smot, Smut, and Smutz are also American and European surnames derived from the name Smout.

See also 
Smot (disambiguation)